Richard Óg de Burgh, 2nd Earl of Ulster and 3rd Baron of Connaught (1259 – 29 July 1326), called The Red Earl (Latinized to  de Burgo), was one of the most powerful Irish nobles of the late 13th and early 14th centuries and father of Elizabeth, wife of King Robert the Bruce of Scotland.

Early life

Richard's father was Walter de Burgh, 1st Earl of Ulster (of the second creation) and Lord of Connacht, who was the second son of Richard Mór de Burgh, 1st Lord of Connaught and Egidia de Lacy. Richard's mother was Aveline FitzJohn, daughter of Sir John FitzGeoffrey.

"Richard Óg", means "Richard the Young", which may be a reference to his youth when he became earl in 1271, or to differentiate him from his grandfather, Richard Mór.

Earl of Ulster

Richard Óg was the most powerful of the de Burgh Earls of Ulster, succeeding his father in Ulster and Connacht upon reaching his majority in 1280. He was a friend of King Edward I of England, who summoned him repeatedly to attend him in person in the Scottish wars, and ranked first among the Earls of Ireland. Richard married Margaret, the daughter of his cousin John de Burgh (also spelt de Borough) and Cecily Baillol. 

He pursued expansionist policies that often left him at odds with fellow Norman lords, in particular the FitzGeralds. In the 1290s he clashed fiercely with John FitzGerald, 1st Earl of Kildare. Matters reached a climax in 1294 when Kildare captured Richard and imprisoned him at Lea Castle for several months "to the disturbance of the whole land". The Parliament of Ireland  eventually secured Richard's release and thereafter relations between the two men improved, with Richard's daughter Joan marrying Kildare's son and heir. Kildare, though he received a royal pardon for his actions, was forced to surrender his lands in Connacht to Richard, and proved no threat to Richard's policy of expansion in the longer term.

Richard's daughter Elizabeth became the second wife of King Robert the Bruce of Scotland. However, this did not stop Richard from leading his forces from Ireland to support England's King Edward I in his Scottish campaigns; Edward captured Elizabeth in 1306, but in order to gain the support of Richard, Edward only put Elizabeth under house arrest. When the forces of Edward Bruce invaded Ulster in 1315, the Red Earl led a force against him, but suffered defeat at Connor in Antrim. The invasion of Bruce and the uprising of Felim McHugh O'Connor in Connacht left Richard virtually without authority in his lands, but O'Connor was killed in 1316 at the Second Battle of Athenry. The result was that Richard was able to recover Ulster after the defeat of Bruce at Faughart.

Richard died on 29 July 1326 at Athassel Priory, near Cashel, County Tipperary.

Children and family

 Aveline de Burgh (b. c. 1280), married John de Bermingham, 1st Earl of Louth
 Eleanor de Burgh (1282 – aft. August 1324), married Thomas de Multon, 1st Baron Multon of Egremont
 Elizabeth de Burgh (c. 1284 – 26 October 1327), Queen consort of Scotland, married Robert the Bruce as his second wife, and was the mother of David II of Scotland
 Walter de Burgh (c. 1285–1304)
 John de Burgh (c. 1286 – 18 June 1313)
 Maud de Burgh (c. 1288–1320), married Gilbert de Clare, 7th Earl of Hertford
 Thomas de Burgh (c. 1292–1316)
 Katherine de Burgh (c. 1296 – 1 November 1331), married Maurice Fitzgerald, 1st Earl of Desmond
 Edmond de Burgh (b. c. 1298)
 Joan de Burgh (c. 1300 – 23 April 1359), married firstly, Thomas FitzGerald, 2nd Earl of Kildare, by whom she had issue, and secondly, Sir John Darcy, 1st Baron Darcy de Knayth, by whom she had issue, including Elizabeth Darcy who married James Butler, 2nd Earl of Ormond

Annalistic references

From the Annals of the Four Masters:

 M1303.8.A great army was led by the King of England into Scotland; and the Red Earl and many of the Irish and English went with a large fleet from Ireland to his assistance. On this occasion they took many cities, and gained sway over Scotland. Theobald Burke, the Earl's brother, died after his return from this expedition, on Christmas night, at Carrickfergus.
 M1304.2. The Countess, wife of Richard Burke, Earl of Ulster, i.e. the Red Earl, and Walter de Burgo, heir of the same Earl, died.
 M1305.2. The new castle of Inishowen was erected by the Red Earl.

Ancestry

Notes

References

 Ancestral Roots of Certain American Colonists Who Came to America Before 1700 by Frederick Lewis Weis; Lines 73–30, 177B-8, 177B-9.
 The Tribes and customs of Hy-Many, John O'Donovan, 1843
 The Surnames of Ireland, Edward MacLysaght, Dublin, 1978.
 The Anglo-Normans in Co. Galway: the process of colonisation, Patrick Holland, Journal of the Galway Archaeological and Historical Society, vol. 41,(1987–88)
 Excavation on the line of the medieval town defences of Loughrea, Co. Galway, J.G.A.& H.S., vol. 41, (1987–88)
 Anglo-Norman Galway; rectangular earthworks and moated sites, Patrick Holland, J.G.A. & H.S., vol. 46 (1993)
  Rindown Castle: a royal fortress in Co. Roscommon, Sheelagh Harbison, J.G.A. & H.S., vol. 47 (1995)
 The Anglo-Norman landscape in County Galway; land-holdings, castles and settlements, Patrick Holland, J.G.A.& H.S., vol. 49 (1997)
 Annals of Ulster at CELT: Corpus of Electronic Texts at University College Cork
 Annals of Tigernach at CELT: Corpus of Electronic Texts at University College Cork
Revised edition of McCarthy's synchronisms at Trinity College Dublin.
 

Burgh
1259 births
1326 deaths
Nobility from County Limerick
Norman warriors
People from County Galway
13th-century Irish people
14th-century Irish people
Richard
Normans in Ireland